Ciriaco is a male given name in Italian and Spanish. In Portuguese, it's spelled Ciríaco.
 
It derives from the Greek given name Κυριακός (also Κυριάκος) which means of the Lord or lordly; from the Greek kύριος, kyrios: lord.  Thus it is equivalent in meaning to names like Dominic, Dominicus and Domenico.

It may refer to:

People

Given name
Ciriaco Álvarez (born 1873), Chiloé businessman
Ciriaco Errasti, a Spanish footballer
Ciriaco De Mita, Italian politician, Prime Minister of Italy (1988–1989)
Ciriaco de' Pizzicolli, or Cyriacus of Ancona, an Italian antiquarian and traveller of the 15th century
Ciriaco Cañete, a Filipino martial artist
Ciriaco Ortiz, a tango musician
Ciriaco Sforza, a Swiss footballer

Surname
Pedro Ciriaco (born 1985), Dominican baseball player for the Boston Red Sox, brother of Audy Ciriaco

Places
 Ciríaco, Brazilian municipality.

See also
Quirico
Quirino (disambiguation)